Refrescante is Menudo's 21st studio album (17th in Spanish) released in 1986, featuring Charlie Massó, Robby Rosa, Ricky Martin,  Raymond Acevedo, and Sergio Blass. These are the second and third albums this line-up recorded together This also the first time the group recorded songs made by Brazilian composers, the single "Diga Sim" was written by Ed Willson and Carlos Colla, the song "Alegria" by Michael Sullivan and Paulo Massadas and "Cara ou Coroa" which version was made by Carlos Costa. In Brazil, the Portuguese version of the album was titled "Menudo", and was released 25 June 1986.

Track listing
Refrescante
 Salta La Valla [3:22] - Singer: Charlie Massó
 Hoy Me Voy Para México [3:26] - Singer: Raymond Acevedo
 Con Un Beso Y Una Flor [3:27] - Singer: Ricky Martin
 La Primera Vez [4:11] - Singer: Robby Rosa
 América [2:54] - Singer: Sergio Blass
 A Cara O Cruz [3:45] - Singer: Charlie Massó and Robby Rosa
 Amor, Siempre Amor [3:34] - Singer: Raymond Acevedo
 Bésame [3:54] - Singer: Robby Rosa
 Yo Te Quiero Mucho [3:00] - Singer: Ricky Martin (Spanish Only)
 Amiga Mía [3:01] - Singer: Sergio Blass

Brazilian Track Listing
Menudo (Menudo's 22nd album, third in Portuguese)
 Vem Pra Luz Do Sol [3:22] - Singer: Charlie Massó
 Hoje A Noite Não Tem Luar [3:26] - Singer: Raymond Acevedo
 Com Um Beijo E Uma Flor [3:27] - Singer: Ricky Martin
 Segredo [4:11] - Singer: Robby Rosa
 E Deus Criou A Mulher [2:54] - Singer: Sergio Blass
 Cara Ou Coroa [3:45] - Singer: Charlie Massó and Robby Rosa
 Amor Sempre Amor [3:34] - Singer: Raymond Acevedo
 Apaga As Luzes [3:54] - Singer: Robby Rosa
 Minha Princesa [3:01] - Singer: Sergio Blass
 Alegria [3:03] - Singer: Charlie Massó (Portuguese Only)
 Diga Sim [3:42] - Singer: Robby Rosa

Production
 Produced By Edgardo Díaz for Padosa América Inc.
 Arranged & Conducted By Carlos Villa & Alejandro Monroy.
 Engineered By Carlos Villa & Alejandro Monroy.
 All songs written by Carlos Villa & Alejandro Monroy.

References

1986 albums
Menudo (band) albums